This is a list of Yorkshire Railways. Most were absorbed by larger railway companies which ended with two of the constituents of The Big Four (London Midland Scottish & London and North Eastern Railway) operating in the Yorkshire & Humber area. These companies were created under the Railways Act 1921 and the act came into effect on 1 January 1923. The Big Four existed for 25 years before being nationalized on 1 January 1948 under the Transport Act 1947.

Some lines escaped being nationalized such as the Derwent Valley Light Railway and the Middleton Railway in Leeds. The latter line's use as a coal railway for the National Coal Board was enough to prevent it being becoming part of the British Rail network.

Privatisation in 1994 onwards has seen the railway ownership pass from British Rail to Railtrack and then onto Network Rail.

Whilst all of these railways are in Yorkshire and the Humber, most of the bigger companies had concerns that stretched far outside of the scope of this list (Midland Railway, Great Central Railway, LNER, etc.) into other regions.

Standard gauge railways

Narrow gauge railways

See also

:Category: Rail transport in North Yorkshire
:Category: Rail transport in the East Riding of Yorkshire
:Category: Rail transport in South Yorkshire
:Category: Rail transport in West Yorkshire

Notes

References

External links 
Route map of Lancashire & Yorkshire Railway

Yorkshire
Rail transport in Yorkshire